Atrichoseris is a genus of plants in the family Asteraceae. It contains only one known species, Atrichoseris platyphylla, known by the common names tobacco weed, parachute plant, and gravel ghost.

A. platyphylla is native to the deserts of the southwestern United States (southern California, Arizona, Nevada and the southwestern corner of Utah) and northwestern Mexico (Sonora, Baja California).

The plant produces a low basal rosette of rounded leaves patterned with gray-green and purple patches at ground level. The flowers bloom between February and May. The hairless fruit has the shape of a five-sided club.

The genus name, Atrichoseris, means 'chicory plant without hairs', referring to the fruit, and the specific epithet, platyphylla, means 'flat-leaved'.

References

External links

Calflora
USDA Plants Profile

Cichorieae
Flora of the California desert regions
Flora of Northwestern Mexico
Flora of the Southwestern United States
Flora of the Sonoran Deserts
Natural history of the Colorado Desert
Natural history of the Mojave Desert
Taxa named by Asa Gray
Monotypic Asteraceae genera